Wainganga College of Engineering and Management, Dongargaon, Wardha Road, Nagpur was established in 2008.

External links
Official website

 Engineering colleges in Nagpur
 Rashtrasant Tukadoji Maharaj Nagpur University